Sarazino (born Lamine Fellah, 3 March 1970 in Constantine, Algeria) is an Algerian musician, songwriter and record producer, who first created the Sarazino project in 1995 while living in Montreal, Quebec, Canada.

Background
Lamine Fellah was raised the son of a career diplomat in Constantine, Algeria. His father's profession moved Lamine and his family all around the world; they lived in Spain, Switzerland, Burundi and Burkina Faso.  At the age of 14, residing in Burkina Faso, Lamine acquired his first drum kit and became interested in writing his own music. His father was assassinated by Islamic radicals in Algeria, and his family was forced into exile.

In 1996, Lamine visited Ecuador; he has since moved to Quito. In 1998, Lamine moved to Montreal, Quebec, Canada to study economics and political science at the University of Montréal.

Discography
Mundo Babilón (2003)
Ya Foy! (2009)
Everyday Salama (2012)
Mama Funny Day (2018)

References

External links
Sarazino Builds Bridges Through Music
Potent Global Fusion
Sounds and Colours
Global Reggae
Musika

1970 births
Living people
Algerian musicians
Algerian songwriters
21st-century Algerian people